Jure Bilić (12 September 1922 – 27 January 2006) was a Yugoslav communist politician.

Bilić was born in Makarska in 1922. In 1941 he joined the Yugoslav Partisans and became a member of the Communist Party of Yugoslavia.

After the World War II, Bilić was the State Secretary for Agriculture in Croatia. His ascendancy to high-ranking positions in the Party began in the early 1970s, after the downfall of the Croatian Spring movement. He served as President of the Parliament of the Socialist Republic of Croatia (1978–1982), Chairman of the Central Committee of the League of Communists of Croatia (1982–1983) and member of the Presidency of the Central Committee of the League of Communists of Yugoslavia (1983–1986).

A party committee vote removed him from office in 1986.

References

Umro bivši visoki politički dužnosnik Jure Bilić 

1922 births
2006 deaths
People from Makarska
Yugoslav Partisans members
League of Communists of Croatia politicians
Presidents of the Parliament of the Socialist Republic of Croatia
Central Committee of the League of Communists of Yugoslavia members